Bigelow Corners is a census-designated place (CDP) in the town of New Fairfield, Fairfield County, Connecticut, United States. It is in the southwest quadrant of the town, northwest of the village of New Fairfield and east of Ball Pond.

Bigelow Corners was first listed as a CDP prior to the 2020 census.

References 

Census-designated places in Fairfield County, Connecticut
Census-designated places in Connecticut